Cowboys and Indians is a 2007 American short film starring Britt George, Nana Kagga, Sebastian Rockefeller, Angela Watson for the American Film Institute.

Cast
 Britt George as Dad
 Nana Kagga as Indianka
 Sebastian Rockefeller as Little Timmy
 Angela Watson as Mom
 Shane Daniel Wood as Cowboy

References

External links

Cowboys and Indians 2007 (Filmweb)

2007 films
2000s English-language films